Buckskin Joe is an unincorporated community in Fremont County, Colorado, United States. The former Buckskin Joe Western-style theme park and railway was located in Buckskin Joe.

See also

References

External links

Unincorporated communities in Fremont County, Colorado
Unincorporated communities in Colorado